The University of Washington Graduate and Professional Student Senate (GPSS) is the official student government for graduate and professional students at the University of Washington. GPSS is made up of two senators from each degree-granting department, four officers and several staff members. GPSS provides students with representation on the university's Seattle campus, in the state legislature, and in Congress. It also acts as a resource center and funds graduate programming.

History
The Graduate & Professional Student Senate was founded in 1967 to provide a separate focus and voice for the interests of graduate and professional students at the University of Washington. Prior to its founding, all students were represented by the Associated Students of the University of Washington (ASUW), founded in 1906.  As interests between the ASUW and GPSS have become more specialized, GPSS has established itself as an organization devoted to serving as a platform for issues related to graduate and professional student life. The two entities formally became two autonomous organizations in April 1976. While the ASUW still represents all students, GPSS represents only graduate and professional student interests.

In 2007 GPSS initiated an annual Higher Education Summit, bringing together academics, policymakers, and practitioners to discuss issues important to higher education and graduate & professional students. Each summit has taken up a different topic related to contemporary issues in higher education in Washington State.  In 2008 GPSS was one of the founding members of Student Advocates for Graduate Education (SAGE), a national coalition of graduate student governments from other top tier public research universities.

Composition
GPSS is governed by a Constitution and a set of Bylaws.  Meetings of the Senate are typically held every other week throughout the school year.  GPSS has five elected officers: President, vice-president of External Affairs, vice-president of Internal Affairs, Treasurer, and Secretary. GPSS has ten internal committees and six subcommittees in addition to the full Senate through which it conducts its business:
 Community and Outreach  
 Dispute Resolution Advisory 
 Elections  
 Executive 
 Finance and Budget
 Government Relations 
 Federal Legislative Steering
 State Legislative Steering
 Graduate Program Review
 Judicial 
 Social 
 University Affairs
 Academic and Administrative Affairs
 Community Affairs
 Student Life
 Diversity

External links

Associated Students of the University of Washington
SAGE Coalition
University of Washington

Washington, University of
University of Washington organizations